South African women's cricket team toured Sri Lanka in the beginning of 2014–15 season. The tour consisted of a series of 4 One day internationals and 3 Twenty20 internationals. First three of the four ODIs formed a part of the 2014–16 ICC Women's Championship.

South Africa won the first WODI and lead the series 1–0. Sri Lanka  won the third WODI to help to level the series 1–1. South Africa won the fourth and final WODI and won series 2–1. South Africa won the WODI series 2–1, after the second match was abandoned due to rain. Sri Lanka won the first WT20I and lead the series 1–0. South Africa won the final two WT20I and won the series 2–1.

Squads 

Chamari Polgampola, Inoshi Priyadharshani, Chandima Gunaratne and Yasoda Mendis were named as stand by player.

ODI series

1st ODI

2nd ODI

3rd ODI

4th ODI

T20I series

1st T20I

2nd T20I

3rd T20I

References

External links 
 Series home at Cricinfo

2014–16 ICC Women's Championship
South Africa women's national cricket team tours
Women's international cricket tours of Sri Lanka
2014 in South African cricket
2014 in Sri Lankan cricket
2014 in women's cricket
2014 in South African women's sport